Contreras Gang is a 1991 Philippine action film edited and directed by Pepe Marcos. The film stars Edu Manzano as the gang leader, along with Rez Cortez, Kevin Delgado, Dindo Arroyo, Willie Revillame and Eric Francisco as the gang members. It was one of the entries in the 1991 Metro Manila Film Festival.

Cast
 Edu Manzano as Mario Contreras
 Cristina Gonzales as Nanette
 Johnny Delgado as Sgt. Pascual
 Monsour Del Rosario as Lt. Lazaro
 Rez Cortez as Tony
 Kevin Delgado as Ricky
 Dindo Arroyo as Albert
 Willie Revillame as Bong
 Eric Francisco as Edwin
 Delia Razon as Ricky's Mother
 Bon Vibar as Ricky's Father
 Marita Zobel as Mario's Mother
 Romeo Rivera as Mario's Father
 Jeena Alvarez as Mario's Sister
 Ester Chavez as Nanette's Mother
 Ross Rival as Nanette's Brother
 Tony Carreon as Beheaded Child's Grandfather
 Sunshine Dizon as Beheaded Child
 Zeny Zabala as Chinese Wife
 Sauro Cotoco as Chinese Husband
 Karen Cua as Chinsese Daughter
 Liza Mojica  as Yaya
 Joseph Serra as Mr. Abaya

Reception
Elvira Mata of the Manila Standard gave Contreras Gang a negative review. He criticized the flaws in its storyline, the recycled musical score used in the film and the poor drama scenes. Mata cites the fight scenes, blowing up a jewelry shop and giving the head of a child as the only best parts of the film.

Awards

References

External links

1991 films
1991 action films
Filipino-language films
Philippine action films
Moviestars Production films